The Azerbaijan Social Prosperity Party is a political party in Azerbaijan.

At the elections (5 November 2000 and 7 January 2001), the party won 1 out of 125 seats. At the parliamentary elections of 6 November 2005 the party kept 1 seat. The first chairman of the party is Khanhuseyn Kazimli, the present chairman of the party is Asli Kazimova (daughter of Khanhuseyn Kazimli).

Political parties in Azerbaijan